Udaya II was King of Anuradhapura from 952 to 955. He succeeded Dappula V as King of Anuradhapura and was succeeded by his brother Sena III.

See also
 List of Sri Lankan monarchs
 History of Sri Lanka

References

External links
 Kings & Rulers of Sri Lanka

Monarchs of Anuradhapura
U
U
U